Mäçkärä is a rural locality (a selo) in Kukmara District, Tatarstan. The population was 229 as of 2010.

Geography 
Mäçkärä is located 25 km north of Kukmara, district's administrative centre, and 163 km northeast of Qazan, republic's capital, by road.

History 
The earliest known record of the settlement dates from 1715. In 18th and the beginning of 19th century village was for its madrasa, which was well-known in Idel-Ural region. The population of Mäçkärä reached its peak of about 1000 inhabitants in 1905.

Before the creation of Tatar ASSR in 1920 was a part of Malmış Uyezd of Wätke Governorate. Since 1920 was a part of Arça Canton; after creation of districts in Tatar ASSR (Tatarstan) in Kukmara (1930–1963), Saba (1963–1965) and Kukmara districts.

Notable objects

References

External links 
 

Rural localities in Kukmorsky District